Običan Radio is a Hercegovina commercial radio station, broadcasting from Mostar, Bosnia and Herzegovina.

Običan Radio was launched on 25 March 2002.

Frequencies
The program is currently broadcast at 2 frequencies:

 Mostar  
 Stolac

References

External links 
 obican.info
 Communications Regulatory Agency of Bosnia and Herzegovina
 Običan Radio Mostar page on Facebook

See also 
List of radio stations in Bosnia and Herzegovina

Mostar
Radio stations established in 2002
Mass media in Mostar